is a 1958 Japanese historical drama film directed by Tadashi Imai. It was written by Kaneto Shindo and Shinobu Hashimoto, based on the 1706 play Horikawa nami no tsuzumi by Monzaemon Chikamatsu. Film historians regard Night Drum as one of director Imai's major works.

Plot
Samurai Hikokuro returns home to his wife Tane after a full year at his shogun's residence in Edo. Rumours have it that Tane committed adultery with a musician in his absence, so the family clan summons for an interrogation. In a series of flashbacks, Tane is first cleared from the charges pressed against her, but after Hikokuro's sister renews the accusations, she finally admits her guilt. In her confession, she recounts how she had first escaped a rape attempt by the very samurai responsible for the rumours about her and, being drunk and in fear, had later spent the night with the musician. In compliance with the samurai honour, Tane is required to commit suicide, and her lover declared fair game. Although Hikokuro has forgiven his wife whom he still loves, he first kills her as she is unable to do so herself, and then the adulterer.

Cast
Rentarō Mikuni as Hikokuro
Ineko Arima as Tane
Masayuki Mori as Miyaji, the musician
Sumiko Hidaka
Keiko Yukishiro
Tomoko Naraoka
Emiko Azuma
Kikue Mōri
Taiji Tonoyama
Ichirō Sugai

References

External links

1958 films
Japanese drama films
Japanese black-and-white films
Japanese films based on plays
Films directed by Imai Tadashi
Films with screenplays by Shinobu Hashimoto
1950s Japanese films